James Ray Hess (December 1, 1936 – October 2, 2021) was an American football coach. He served as the head football coach at Angelo State University in San Angelo, Texas from 1974 to 1981, Stephen F. Austin State University in Nacogdoches, Texas from 1982 to 1988, and New Mexico State University in Las Cruces, New Mexico from 1990 to 1996, compiling career college football coaching record of 134–108–5. Hess led his 1978 Angelo State team to a NAIA Division I Football National Championship. Hess began his coaching career at the high school level in the state of Texas. He was also a scout for the Dallas Cowboys of the National Football League (NFL).

Early years
Hess was a native of Farmersville, Texas. He attended Farmersville High School. He later enrolled at Paris Junior College. He transferred to Southeastern Oklahoma State University after his sophomore season. He received his master's degree from the University of North Texas in 1966.

Professional career
Hess began his football coaching career at Farmersville High School in 1959, winning one district title. He then was hired as an assistant at McKinney High School from 1961 to 1962. He coached at Rockwall High School from 1963 to 1964, where his team captured the 1963 Class AA state championship. He was hired at Kilgore High School from 1965 to 1966. In 1967, he became an assistant coach at Rice University. In 1971, he returned to the high school ranks as the head coach at Sterling High School.

In 1972, he was hired at Angelo State University as the defensive coordinator. He was the head football coach from 1974 to 1981. In 1977, he was named the conference Coach of the Year. In 1978, the team went undefeated (14-0) and won the NAIA Division I Football National Championship, while he received NAIA Coach of the Year honors. He led the Rams to six Top 20 rankings and a 65-23 (.731) mark, at the time the highest winning percentage in school history. He was also one of the few coaches to win more than 100 games at the I-AA level.

He coached at Stephen F. Austin State University from 1982 to 1988, where he compiled a 47–30–2 record, including a 10–3 mark in his final season. He led the school to five winning seasons, its first-ever conference title in 1985 and earned conference Coach of the Year honors. He resigned at the end of the 1988 season with a 47-30-2 (.608) record, the highest winning percentage in school history at the time. In 1989, he was named the athletic director. During his time with the school, he was instrumental in moving the program from the NAIA to NCAA Division II and into Division I-AA, while helping to renovate the athletic facilities.

Hess was named the head coach at New Mexico State University in 1990, where he inherited a 17-game losing streak. Although his Aggie team was called the “worst team in America” in 1992 by Sports Illustrated, he led the program to its first winning season in 14 years with a 6-5 mark, while being named the Big West Coach of the Year. He was fired in 1996 after his second 1–10 season at the school. He was the fourth winningest coach in school history with a 22-55-0 record. He finished with a career college coaching record of 134–108–5.

Personal life
Hess was hired by the Dallas Cowboys as an area scout for the Midwest in 1997, where he remained until 2006. Sean Payton and him are credited with "finding" Tony Romo in 2006, then an unknown, undrafted free-agent from Division I-AA Eastern Illinois. Hess later worked for Daktronics and as color commentator for football games at Angelo State University. Hess died at the age of 84 on October 2, 2021.

Head coaching record

College

References

1936 births
2021 deaths
American football cornerbacks
American football fullbacks
Angelo State Rams football coaches
Dallas Cowboys scouts
New Mexico State Aggies football coaches
Rice Owls football coaches
Southeastern Oklahoma State Savage Storm baseball players
Southeastern Oklahoma State Savage Storm football players
Stephen F. Austin Lumberjacks and Ladyjacks athletic directors
Stephen F. Austin Lumberjacks football coaches
High school football coaches in Texas
Junior college football players in the United States
University of North Texas alumni
People from Farmersville, Texas
Players of American football from Texas
Baseball players from Texas